Dust is the seventh studio album by Screaming Trees, released on June 25, 1996.

After an aborted attempt at recording a followup to Sweet Oblivion with producer Don Fleming, the band hired producer George Drakoulias to man the controls for what eventually turned out to be their last album released during the group's lifetime. In contrast to the group's previous recordings that were more influenced by psychedelic rock and punk rock, Dust contains music that is equally influenced by folk and blues, while still retaining a harder-edged sound. "All I Know" was released as a single from the album and became a success on rock radio. "Dying Days" features Pearl Jam guitarist Mike McCready.

Kerrang! Magazine selected Dust as the best album of 1996 in their year-end awards. The band toured behind Dust for nearly two years (with former Kyuss and future Queens of the Stone Age frontman Josh Homme serving as a touring guitarist), and afterwards went on an extended hiatus, eventually disbanding officially in 2000.

Track listing
All songs written by Van Conner, Gary Lee Conner, Mark Lanegan except as indicated.

 "Halo of Ashes"  (V. Conner, G. Conner, Lanegan, Barrett Martin) – 4:04
 "All I Know" – 3:55
 "Look at You" – 4:42
 "Dying Days" – 4:51
 "Make My Mind" – 4:11
 "Sworn and Broken" – 3:34
 "Witness" – 3:39
 "Traveler" – 5:22
 "Dime Western"  (V. Conner, G. Conner, Lanegan, Martin) – 3:39
 "Gospel Plow"  (V. Conner, G. Conner, Lanegan, Martin) – 6:17

Personnel 
 Screaming Trees
 Gary Lee Conner – acoustic guitar, electric guitar, backing vocals, sitar
 Van Conner – bass, backing vocals, guitar
 Mark Lanegan – lead vocals, guitar
 Barrett Martin – percussion, cello, drums, conga, harmonium, tabla, djembe

 Additional musicians
 George Drakoulias – percussion, producer
 Chris Goss – backing vocals
 Brian Jenkins – backing vocals on "Traveler"
 Mike McCready – guitar solo on "Dying Days"
 Jeff Nolan – guitar on "Dime Western"
 Benmont Tench – organ, electric piano, mellotron, piano
 21st Street Singers – backing vocals on "Dying Days"

 Additional personnel
 Mark Danielson – front cover artwork
 Danny Clinch – photography

Charts

References

External links

Dust (Adobe Flash) at Radio3Net (streamed copy where licensed)
Dust (Adobe Flash) at Myspace (streamed copy where licensed)

Screaming Trees albums
1996 albums
Albums produced by George Drakoulias